Kuvezino is a rural locality (a village) in Klyazminskoye Rural Settlement, Kovrovsky District, Vladimir Oblast, Russia. The population was 23 as of 2010.

Geography 
Kuvezino is located 45 km east of Kovrov (the district's administrative centre) by road. Stepanovo is the nearest rural locality.

References 

Rural localities in Kovrovsky District